Mohammad Hadi Mofatteh (born 1966 in Qom, Iran) he is a Twelver Shia Muslim cleric. with the religious rank Hujjat al-Islam. Since September 2018, he has been the head and director of the Islamic Center Hamburg, the center of Shiite Islam in Germany.

Studying and teaching 
He studied primary education in Tehran, in 1984 received his diploma in the field of mathematics. He studied electrical engineering at the University of Tehran. and later came to theology. After studying theology, He studied his master program in the Quran and Hadith science at the Usul Al Deen College of Qom from 1996 to 2000 and his professors were Allameh Sayyed Murtaza Asgari and Ayatollah Mohammad Hadi Marefat, and studied in the period from 2003 to 2008 his Ph.D. in Quran and Hadith science at Usul Al Deen College and his lecturers were Dr. Seyyed Mohammad Baqir Hojati and Ayatollah Marefat. he received his doctorate with the work Quran and Nahj al-Balagha on the realm of religious government and sovereignty right, a thesis on the derivation of theories of governance from the Quran and Nahj al-Balāgha. he teaches at the theological college of Qom.

He studied high school and college and attended courses in Tehran's seminary. His professors were Seyed Ali Hashemi Golpayegani, Seyyed Hassan Mostafavi, Sayyid Hossein Mostafavi and Dr. Abolghasem Gorgi in the fields of Jurisprudence, Principles, and Philosophy.

He studied in the Qom Seminary to complete the high level courses and his professors were Sayyid Ali Mohaghegh Damad, Hasanzadeh Amoli, Hasan Ghadiri, Etemadi, Reza Ostadi, and Ali Mohammadi Khorasani. He studied lessons on jurisprudence and principles in Tehran's Seminary with the Great Ayatollahs Seyyed Ali Khamenei and Hajj Aqa Mojtaba Tehrani. After returning to Qom, he studied jurisprudence, the principles and philosophy of the Great Ayatollahs Fazel Lankarani, Shabiri Zanjani, Javadi Amoli, Vahid Khorasani, and Moemen Qomi.

He taught high levels in the Qom Seminary with several courses in jurisprudence and philosophy, and since the academic year of 2012 he has been teaching outside jurisprudence (highest level in jurisprudence) in the Qom Seminary.

Professor Mohammad Hadi Mofatteh has been promoted to Associate Professor of Quran and Hadith Science since October 2008 and has been promoted to professorship in February 2014. In addition to teaching at this university, he also teaches at Qom Azad University, Religion and Theology faculty, Usul Al Deen College, faculty of Quran and Hadith, Imam Khomeini Specialized University, Higher School of Interpretation, Quran University of Science and Education, and Farhangian University bachelor's degree, master's degree and doctorate degrees. So far, the guidance and consultant of the dissertations of Ph.D. and master's degrees have been numerous for him.

His Family 
Mohammad Hadi Mofatteh is the son of Mohammad Mofatteh (1928–1979), who was a religious scholar and professor at the University of Tehran and was one of the great thinkers who assassinated by Forghan group in front of the building of Theology department of Tehran University.

Positions 

 Member of the Board of Directors and Technical Deputy Computer Research Center of Islamic Sciences (1992–1998)
 Founder and director of the National Maaref Radio Broadcasting Network (1998–1999)
 Secretary of the High Council for Religious Affairs of the Voice of the Islamic Republic of Iran (1999–2006)
 director of the Islamic Economics Department at the Center for Islamic Studies of Iran's television (2004–2005)
 Director of the Department of Quran and Hadith science of the University of Qom (2010–2012)
 Deputy of Education and Research of the Faculty of Theology and Islamic Education of Qom University (2012–2014)
 Board member of Islamic Azad University, Hamedan Province (2010–2016)
 representative of the Minister of Science in the Supervisory Board of Islamic scholar of the University of Qom (2015–2018)
 member of the board of directors of the Qur'anic Studies Association of Qom (2015–2018)
 member of the elected council and research assistant of the Supreme Council of Qom Islamic Seminary (2016–2018).
 as the representative of the Shi'ite authority, took over the responsibility of the Islamic Center of Hamburg and the imamate of the Hamburg mosque from September 2018, at the age of 51.

Publications 

 three books of power theory derived from the Quran and tradition
 the study of the distortion of the Quran
 Orientalism or Islamophobia (2016).
 
 
 
 
 a manifestation of the rule of law in the traditions of the Prophet
 the language of the Quran from the perspective of Ghazali
 the extent of government interference And jurisprudence from the point of view of the Quran and Nahj al-Balaghah
 the place of rational reason in the principles of Shia and Sunni jurisprudence
 the verses of the Hajj with an adaptive approach
 the lifestyle of the underlying managers
 privacy; Social ethics
 social activity of women in the opinions of Shia and Sunni commentators based on the verses of 33 surah al-Ahzab and 24 surah Nisa
 the scope of freedom of the artist in relation to the privacy of individuals and guilds
 Review of the judgment of Akhund Khorasani and Imam Khomeini regarding the validity of the narrations of Mustadrek al-Wasel
 
 
 comparative interpretation; Analyzing the verse of Imamat in the interpretation of Sunni and Shia
 The Rule of Importance and the Unethical Theory of Justification
 The negotiation of Alast and the Criticism of Commentator's Perspectives on the Verse of the Misagh
 The Critique of the Adoption of the Quran from the Literature of the Time, Analyzing the Viewpoint of Yousef Dareh Haddad
 The Imam Ali's Creation and Expansion of Consistency Society, relying on the role of the national media (2016); an interpretative survey on the halalness of marriage with the women of the book
 Assignment and analysis of economic corruption and its economic consequences in Quran and Hadith
 Ethics in Politics, a Comparison between Machiavelli, Qur'an, and Ali
 The Relation of Family and Society in New Models of Communication from Islamic Perspective
 The Relationship between Governmental Popularity and its Religious Legitimacy (August, 2016); Transmitters of Hadith of Abu al-Qasim al-Khoei in General Reliability

See also 

 Islamic Centre Hamburg
 Mohammad Mofatteh

References

External links 
 Mohammad Hadi Mofatteh's personal page

 Mohammad Moffateh's list of published works/articles
 Mohammad Hadi Mofatteh, Noormags
 
 Mohammad Hadi Mofatteh IMDb

1966 births
Academic staff of the Islamic Azad University
21st-century Iranian philosophers
Iranian writers
Living people
Iranian Shia scholars of Islam
University of Tehran alumni
Academic staff of Farhangian University